The 1988 Thomas Cup & Uber Cup was the 15th tournament of Thomas Cup and the 12th tournament of Uber Cup, the most important badminton team competitions in the world.

China won its third title in the Thomas Cup and in the Uber Cup, after beating in the final round Malaysia and Korea, respectively.

Thomas Cup

Teams
35 teams took part in the competition. China, as defending champion, and Malaysia, as host team, skipped the Qualifications and played directly at the Final Stage.

Qualification groups

Qualifying venue: Amsterdam

Qualifying venue: Melbourne

Qualifying venue: New Delhi

Qualifying venue: San Jose

Final stage

Group A

Group B

Knockout stage

Final

Uber Cup

Teams
31 teams took part in the competition, and eight teams qualified for the Final Stage.

Final stage

Group A

Group B

Knockout stage

Final

References
Smash: 1988 Thomas Cup - Final Round

Thomas Uber Cup
Thomas & Uber Cup